The 310th Infantry Regiment was a National Army Infantry Regiment first organized for service in World War I as part of the 78th Division.  It later served in the European Theater during World War II.  Since then it has served as a training Regiment, training Army Reserve and Army National Guard Soldiers for service in support of the Global War on Terror.

Service history

World War I
The Regiment was constituted 5 August 1917 in the National Army as the 310th Infantry and assigned to the 155th Infantry Brigade of the 78th Division. It was organized at Camp Dix, New Jersey, on 6 September 1917.  The regiment was organized with 3,755 officers and enlisted men:
 Headquarters & Headquarters Company- 303
 Supply Company- 140
 Machine Gun Company- 178
 Medical & Chaplain Detachment- 56
 Infantry Battalion (x3)- 1,026
 Headquarters- 2
 Rifle Company (x4)- 256
The Doughboys of the regiment deployed to France as part of the American Expeditionary Forces and participated in the St. Mihiel, Meuse-Argonne, and Lorraine campaigns. After completing its war service in France, the regiment returned home aboard the USS Tiger.  They arrived at the Port of New York on 31 May 1919 and demobilized at Camp Dix on 6 June 1919.

Between the Wars
 The regiment was reconstituted in the Organized Reserves as the 310th Infantry on 24 June 1921 and reassigned to the 78th Division (later redesignated as the 78th Infantry Division) in the First Corps Area. It was organized in December 1921 with the Regimental Headquarters in Jersey City.  The regiment normally conducted summer training at Camp Dix with the 16th and 18th Infantry Regiments or at Plattsburg Barracks with the 26th Infantry Regiment.  The regiment was tasked to conduct Citizens' Military Training Camp (CMTC) some years as an alternative summer training.  Rutgers University was the primary ROTC feeder school.

World War II

The regiment was ordered into active military service 15 August 1942 and reorganized at Camp Butner, North Carolina, using a cadre provided by the 2nd Infantry Division.  
In July 1943, the regiment was organized with 3,256 officers and enlisted men:
 Headquarters & Headquarters Company- 111
 Service Company- 114
 Anti-Tank Company- 165
 Cannon Company- 118
 Medical Detachment- 135
 Infantry Battalion (x3)- 871
 Headquarters & Headquarters Company- 126
 Rifle Company (x3)- 193
 Weapons Company- 156
The regiment served in the Rhineland, Ardennes-Alsace, Central Europe campaigns.  The regiment was inactivated 15 June 1946 in Germany.

Post War Service
The Regiment was reconstituted on 17 December 1946 in the Organized Reserves with headquarters in Jersey City, New Jersey, under TOE 29-7T.  On 9 November 1955 the Regimental Headquarters was moved to Kearny, New Jersey and then to Lodi, New Jersey on 12 October 1961. The 1948 organization of the regiment called for a strength of 3,774 officers and enlisted men organized as below:
 Headquarters & Headquarters Company- 289
 Service Company- 186
 Tank Company- 148
 Heavy Mortar Company- 190
 Medical Company- 214
 Infantry Battalion (x3)
 Headquarters & Headquarters Company- 119
 Rifle Company (x3)- 211
 Weapons Company- 165

Under the 78th Training Division
The 310th Infantry was redesignated as the 310th Regiment (Basic Combat Training), and reorganized to consist of the 1st, 2d, and 3d Battalions, elements of the 78th Division (Training) on 31 January 1968, the Regimental Headquarters was deactivated.  The 1st and 3rd Battalions were activated on 25 January 1991 to train Army Reserve units deploying to Operation Desert Storm and inactivated again on 31 March.  The 1st Battalion was reactivated and allotted to the Regular Army on 17 October 1999 and assigned at Fort Dix.

Current Assignment
 The 1st Battalion is a Regular Army unit assigned to the 181st Infantry Brigade at Fort McCoy, Wisconsin, with a mission to train Brigade Engineer Battalions, Military Police, and Chemical units.  The Battalion frequently sends personnel to NTC and JRTC to train units conducting rotations.
 The 2nd Battalion is an Army Reserve unit assigned to the 86th Training Division with a mission to train Combat Support and Combat Service Support units.

Campaign streamers

Decorations

References

Military units and formations established in 1917
310
310
310